Francis Spufford FRSL (born 1964) is an English author and teacher of writing whose career has seen him shift gradually from non-fiction to fiction. His first novel Golden Hill received critical acclaim and numerous prizes including the Costa Book Award for a first novel, the Desmond Elliott Prize and the Ondaatje Prize. In 2007 he was elected a Fellow of the Royal Society of Literature.

Early life
Spufford was born in 1964. He is the son of the late social historian Professor Margaret Spufford (1935–2014) and the late economic historian Professor Peter Spufford (1934–2017). He studied English literature at Trinity Hall, Cambridge, gaining a BA in 1985.

Career
He was Chief Publisher's Reader from 1987–1990 for Chatto & Windus.

Spufford was a Royal Literary Fund fellow at Anglia Ruskin University from 2005 to 2007, and since 2008 has taught at Goldsmiths College in London on the MA in Creative and Life Writing there. In 2018 he was made a professor.

Publications
Spufford specialized in works of non-fiction for the first part of his career, but began a transition towards fiction in 2010. In 2016 he for the first time published a book which could indisputably be classified as a novel.
 I May Be Some Time: Ice and the English Imagination, 1996 - won literary prizes including the Sunday Times Young Writer of the Year Award, Writers Guild Award for Best Non-Fiction Book of the Year, and the Somerset Maugham Award in 1997.
 The Child That Books Built, 2002
 Backroom Boys: The Secret Return of the British Boffin, 2003 - nominated for the Aventis Prize 
 Red Plenty, 2010 - longlisted for the Orwell Prize, and translated into Dutch, Spanish, Estonian, Polish, German, Russian and Italian, with versions in French and Turkish following. This is a fusion of history and fiction which dramatises the period in the history of the USSR (c.1960) when the possibility of creating greater abundance than capitalism seemed near. It is influenced by science fiction, and uses many of its tools, but is not itself science fiction.
 Unapologetic, 2012, translated into Dutch as Dit is Geen Verdediging, 2013, into Spanish as Impenitente and German as Heilige (Un)Vernunft!, 2014.
 Golden Hill, 2016 - won the Costa Book Award for a first novel, the Desmond Elliott Prize, the New York City Book Award of the New York Society Library, and the Ondaatje Prize. The novel was also shortlisted for the Walter Scott Prize for Historical Fiction, the Rathbones Folio Prize, the Authors' Club Best First Novel Award and the British Book Awards Debut Novel of the Year.
 True Stories and Other Essays, 2017
 Light Perpetual, 2021, with translations into German, Dutch, Italian, Danish, Spanish, Catalan, Russian and Arabic to follow – longlisted for the 2021 Booker Prize.
Spufford has also edited three anthologies: The Chatto Book of Cabbages and Kings, 1989, about lists used as a literary device, The Chatto Book of the Devil, 1993, and The Antarctic, 2008.

In March 2019, it was reported that Spufford had written a novel, The Stone Table, set in the universe of C. S. Lewis’s Narnia series, during the time between The Magician's Nephew and The Lion, the Witch and the Wardrobe. Spufford distributed self-printed copies to friends. The novel was praised as a "seamless recreation of Lewis’s writing-style", and Spufford hoped to obtain permission from the C. S. Lewis estate to publish it commercially. In the absence of permission, the earliest publication date would be 2034, seventy years after Lewis’s death, when the copyright on the original books expires in the UK.

Personal life
Spufford lives just outside Cambridge and is a Fellow of the Royal Society of Literature. He is a practising Christian and is married to an Anglican priest, the Reverend Dr Jessica Martin, who is a Residentiary Canon of Ely Cathedral. He served from 2015 to 2021 on General Synod as a lay representative of the Diocese of Ely.

References

External links
 Tumblr for Unapologetic 
 Tumblr for "Golden Hill" 
 Ebook of critical essays on Red Plenty 

English writers
English Christians
Living people
1964 births
Alumni of Trinity Hall, Cambridge
Academics of Goldsmiths, University of London
Fellows of the Royal Society of Literature
English male novelists